Miss World Chile (Spanish: Miss Mundo Chile)  is a national beauty pageant which has been held sporadically since 1963, responsible for selecting Chile's representative to Miss World.

History
Chile has sent 41 representatives, has had three Miss World Semi-Finalists and One Quarter-Finalist. In 1998, Daniella Campos won the title of Queen of the Americas and in 2011 Gabriela Pulgar won the Talent Competition.

The first Miss World Chile was selected from a small group of contestants by an Argentinian company that had the franchise for five South American countries. 

During the early 1980s and to the late 1990s, Channel 13 transmitted Miss Mundo Chile Semi-Finals and Finals.

From 2011 to 2013, the Chilean representative was selected under the Miss Chile organization. During the last two years of the organization, the Chilean representative has been selected through reality show No Basta con Ser Bella and Proyecto Miss Chile, transmitted by Channel 13 in conjunction with the president of Miss Chile – in that time – Carla Marin.

In 2014, Miss Chile was dissolved, leaving the country without a representative to the International Contest. In 2015 Chile will send a representative, this time under the franchise Miss Mundo Chile organized by Ricardo Güiraldes and Eugenio Manzur.

The current titleholder is Anahi Hormazabal Garay, from Santiago, who will participate at the Miss World 2018 pageant in 8 December at the Crown of Beauty Theatre in Sanya, People's Republic of China.

Titleholders

The winner of Miss Mundo Chile represents her country at the Miss World. On occasion, when the winner does not qualify (due to age) a runner-up is sent.

See also
 Miss Universo Chile

References

External links
 Miss Chile 1988 in Miss World 1988 competition
 Mister World Chile Official Site
 Miss World Chile 1967 competition
 Miss World Chile 1969 competition
 The Miss World Chile competition through the years

 
1951 establishments in Chile
Chilean awards
Chile
Beauty pageants in Chile